The Lebanese Second Division is the second division of Lebanese football. It is controlled by the Federation Libanaise de Football Association. The top two teams qualify for the Lebanese Premier League and replace the relegated teams.

Table

League table

Teams 

 Al-Ahli Nabatieh
 Ahly Saida
 Amal Maarka
 Bourj
 Egtimaey Trablos
 Hekmeh FC
 Homentmen
 Mabarrah
 Nasser Bar Elias
 Shabab Al-Ghazieh
 Shabab Majdal Anjar
 Shabab Sahel

Bourj and Shabab Majdal Anjar were promoted from the Third Division, while Shabab Sahel and Egtimaey Trablos were relegated from the Lebanese Premier League in 2016-17.

References 

2017–18 in Lebanese football
Lebanese Second Division seasons
2017–18 in Asian second tier association football leagues